Kohler is a surname.

Kohler may also refer to:

Places
 Kohler, Wisconsin
 Little Kohler, Wisconsin
 Kohler Glacier
 Kohler Range

Companies
 Chocolat Kohler

Other uses 
 Köhler & Son, London horn makers
 Kohler Co.
 Köhler disease